Filippo Perlo (8 February 1873 -  4 November 1948) was an Italian Catholic prelate, who was the Vicar Apostolic Emeritus of Kenya (Archdiocese of Nyeri, Kenya) and Bishop Titular of Maronea. He was also Superior General of the Consolata Missionaries (IMC).

Vocation
Born in Caramagna Piemonte, Piedmont, he was ordained a priest in the Consolata Missionaries on 10 August 1895, aged 22.

On 15 July 1909, aged 36, he was appointed as Vicar Apostolic of Kenya and Bishop Titular of Maronea.
On 23 October 1909, he was ordained as Bishop Titular  of Maronea. He was consecrated by Agostino Cardinal Richelmy.

On 18 November 1925, aged 52, he resigned as Vicar Apostolic of Kenya.

On 16 February 1926, he was named as the Superior General of Consolata Missionaries. On 11 January 1929, almost 56 years old, he resigned.

Death
On 4 November 1948, aged 75, Bishop Perlo died, holding the title of Vicar Apostolic Emeritus of Kenya.

He had been a priest for 53 years and a bishop for 39 years.

References

External links
Catholic Hierarchy biodata on Bishop Perlo

1873 births
1948 deaths
People from the Province of Cuneo
20th-century Italian titular bishops
Italian Roman Catholic bishops in Africa
Italian Roman Catholic missionaries
20th-century Roman Catholic bishops in Kenya
Roman Catholic missionaries in Kenya
Italian expatriates in Kenya
British Kenya people
Roman Catholic bishops of Nyeri